Andrew Mitchell (born June 12, 1985) is an American football offensive tackle who is currently a free agent. He played college at Oklahoma State University. He was signed by the Cincinnati Bengals on April 30, 2010

He has also been a member of the Seattle Seahawks and Jacksonville Jaguars. Mitchell is a member of The Church of Jesus Christ of Latter-day Saints and served an LDS mission in California.

External links
Cincinnati Bengals bio
Seattle Seahawks bio

References

1985 births
Living people
People from Choctaw, Oklahoma
Players of American football from Oklahoma
American football offensive tackles
Oklahoma State Cowboys football players
Cincinnati Bengals players
Seattle Seahawks players
Jacksonville Jaguars players
American Latter Day Saints
21st-century Mormon missionaries